The Bhāgīrathī (Pron: /ˌbʌgɪˈɹɑːθɪ/) is a turbulent Himalayan river in the Indian state of Uttarakhand, and one of the two headstreams of the Ganges, the major river of Northern India and the holy river of Hinduism. In the Hindu faith, mythology, and culture, the Bhagirathi is considered the source stream of the Ganges. However, in hydrology, the other headstream, Alaknanda, is considered the source stream on account of its great length and discharge.  The Bhagirathi and Alaknanda join at Devprayag in Garhwal and are thereafter known as the Ganges.

Etymology
Bhagiratha was a descendant of King Sagara of the Suryavanshi, or Surya Dynasty. He played an important role in the descent of the Ganges. The story of Bhagiratha is narrated in the Ramayana, Mahabharata, and Puranas.

Wanting to show his sovereignty, King Sagara performed a ritual known as ashvamedha, where a horse was left to wander for one year. However, Indra stole the horse to prevent the ritual from being successful. Learning that the horse had disappeared, King Sagara sent his sixty thousand sons to look for it. They eventually found the horse at the ashram of sage Kapila. Thinking that sage Kapila had stolen the horse, the sons interrupted him while he was in deep meditation. This infuriated sage Kapila and with his ascetic's gaze burned all sixty thousand sons to ashes. King Sagara sent his grandson, Anshuman, to ask sage Kapila what could be done to bring deliverance to their souls.

Sage Kapila advised that only the water of the Ganges, which flowed in the heavens, could liberate them. Bhagiratha, Anshuman's grandson, undertook ascetic practice and won the favour of Brahma and Shiva. Brahma allowed Ganga to descend on earth, while Shiva broke Ganga's fall in the coils of his hair so that her force would not shatter the earth.

When Ganga descended, Bhagiratha took her through the mountains, foothills, the plains of India, and to the sea where she liberated the sixty thousand sons of King Sagara. Due to Bhagiratha's role in the descent of the Ganges, the source stream came to be known as Bhagirathi.

Course
The headwaters of the Bhagirathi River are formed at Gaumukh at the foot of the Gangotri glacier. From Gaumukh the river reaches the town of Gangotri. From Gangotri, it travels down a deep gorge and arrives at Bhaironghati. The river continues to travel to Harsil and crosses the Bhagirathi Granite. It then enters a wide valley and meets two tributaries near Jhala. The river continues to flow downwards to Uttarkashi and then through Dharasu, Chinyalisaur, and the old town of Tehri. From Tehri, the river reaches Devprayag via the Himalayas. At Devprayag, the Bhagirathi River converges with the Alaknanda River and travels onward as the Ganges River.

The Bhagirathi River is mythologically known to be the source stream for the Ganges River. In hydrology, the Alaknanda is the source stream for the Ganges River due to its length and discharge.

Tributaries
The Bhagirathi River is joined by several tributaries; these are, in order from the source: 
Kedar Ganga at Gangotri (elevation ),
Jadh Ganga at Bhaironghati (elevation ),
Kakora Gad and Jalandhari Gad near Harsil (elevation ),
Siyan Gad near Jhala (elevation ),
Asi Ganga near Uttarkashi (elevation ),
Bhilangna River near Old Tehri (elevation ).

Chaukhamba I is the highest point of the Bhagirathi basin.

Dams
There are 18 dams along the Bhagirathi River , either in operation, under construction or planned. These are, in order from the source:

Notes

References
  available on microfilm

External links 

Rivers of Uttarakhand
Rivers of West Bengal
International rivers of Asia
Sacred rivers
Rigvedic rivers
Bhagirathi
Ganges basin
Rivers of India